Antje Geerk (born 17 June 1938 in Kiel) is a German stage and film actress.

Life 
Geerk was born the daughter of an engineer. During the Second World War, she lived with a great-grandmother in Landshut, but before the end of the war moved to her parents in Göttingen and attended a local primary school. After a short period of residence in Kiel and Weil am Rhein, Geerk attended the humanistic grammar school in Lörrach. In 1955 she passed the Abitur in Kiel. She lived at this time with grandparents.

Geerk originally wanted to become an engineer, but was already interested in acting during her school years and took appropriate lessons. In 1955 she passed an aptitude test as an actress in Hamburg.

Selected filmography 
 1957: Doctor Bertram
 1958: That Won't Keep a Sailor Down
 1958: The Green Devils of Monte Cassino
 1958: Worüber man nicht spricht.
 1958: 
 1959: Arzt aus Leidenschaft.
 1959: Uncle Was a Vampire
 1959: A Summer You Will Never Forget
 1962:

References

External links 
 

1938 births
Living people
Actors from Kiel
German stage actresses
German film actresses
20th-century German actresses